Cryptocoryne undulata, also known as undulate cryptocoryne, is a plant species belonging to the Araceae genus Cryptocoryne.

Taxonomy
In the literature of the 60's this plant was considered a form of C. willisii but see the Cryptocoryne page for a discussion of the name change and the 'diploid and 'triploid' forms.

Distribution
Sri Lanka, Thailand

Description
Its long, ruffled dark green leaves may grow to more than 14 inches (35 cm) when mature. It is variable in form under different conditions and origin; low light levels may produce light green leaves.

Cultivation
Considered one of the easier cryptocorynes to grow in an aquarium, it will grow well partially and fully submersed and flowers relatively easily. It prefers bright light and a temperature range of 72-82 degrees F (22-28 degrees C). The 'diploid' form forms runners. Common in the aquarium trade.

References
 Wendt, A., 1956. Cryptocoryne undulata Wendt, Cryptocoryne willisii Engler ex Baum. Het Aquarium 26(9) : 207-208.
 Jacobsen, N., 1981. Cryptocoryne undulata Wendt und Bemerkungen zu andere Arten. Aqua-Planta 2-81 : 31-38.
 Jacobsen, N., 1981. Cryptocoryne undulata Wendt und Bemerkungen zu anderen Arten - ein Nachtrag. Aqua-Planta 4-81 : 92-94.

External links
 Tropica
 AquaHobby
 Cryptocoryne undulata illustrations

undulata
Aquatic plants